Sackler Faculty of Medicine is a medical school affiliated with Tel Aviv University, located  in Tel Aviv, Israel.

History
The Sackler School of Medicine was named for Arthur, Mortimer and Raymond Sackler, and was founded and named prior to the establishment of Purdue Pharma, the developer of oxycodone (OxyContin®). All three were medical professionals who made substantial donations to the school. Each year the school presents the Sackler Prize for a significant contribution to the fields of physics or chemistry.  

The Sackler School of Medicine has consistently been ranked one of the 151-200 best medical schools according to the Shanghai Global Ranking of Academic Subjects.

Naming Controversy

The school has received public pressure to remove the Sackler name, due to ongoing controversy regarding the Sackler family and their alleged role in and lawsuits regarding overprescription of addictive pharmaceutical drugs, including OxyContin. In 2019, Physicians for Human Rights–Israel said it had sent a letter to the dean of the Sackler School of Medicine requesting that the family’s name be removed.  Rabbi Yuval Cherlow, a leading ethicist in Israel and ethics chairman at both Israel’s organ donation association and Tzohar, a group that reaches out to secular Jews, has publicly criticized the Medical Program for maintaining the name.  As of 2022, the school remains the only Medical School in the world to bear the Sackler name. 

The Medical school decided in 2022 to remove the Sackler name from their U.S. facing Medical Program, although they declined to remove the name completely from the medical program itself. The American program is now called the American Medical Program at Tel Aviv University.

Schools
School of Medicine
New York State / American Program
School of Public Health
School of Continuing Medical Education (CME)
School of Dental Medicine
The Stanley Steyer School of Health Professions
The Dr. Miriam and Sheldon G. Adelson Graduate School of Medicine

New York State-American Program
The New York State/American Program is chartered by the Regents of the University of the State of New York and is accredited by the State of Israel. Established in 1976, the Program is taught in English and has a student population of 250. The program is open to  citizens or permanent residents of the United States or Canada. The goal of the program is to provide graduates with a comprehensive academic foundation in the science of human disease and the clinical skills needed for diagnoses and treatment. Sackler strives to cultivate qualities that foster an empathetic, ethical doctor-patient relationship. Its curriculum and teaching methods are modeled after those of U.S. medical schools. Classes are small. Classroom, laboratory and clinical sessions are supplemented by self-study and by tutoring and seminars in small groups. Clinical clerkships begin in the third year.  At the beginning of the fourth year, students take 16 weeks of electives at U.S. medical institutions.

Israeli teaching institutions affiliated with Sackler include seven major medical centers, seven psychiatric hospitals, 20 research institutes and a large rehabilitation center.

Graduates enter the National Resident Matching Program to secure medical residencies, much like students from medical schools in the US.

See also
List of universities in Israel
List of medical schools in Israel

References

External links
 Sackler Faculty of Medicine Website
 Sackler School of Medicine New York State/American Program

Medical schools in Israel
Tel Aviv University
Sackler family